Thiruppandurai is a village in the Kumbakonam taluk of Thanjavur district, Tamil Nadu, India.

Demographics 

In the 2001 census, Thiruppandurai had a population of 1321, with 684 males and 637 females. The sex ratio was 931. The literacy rate was 76.38%.

References 

 

Villages in Thanjavur district